A system of skew coordinates is a curvilinear coordinate system where the coordinate surfaces are not orthogonal, in contrast to orthogonal coordinates.

Skew coordinates tend to be more complicated to work with compared to orthogonal coordinates since the metric tensor will have nonzero off-diagonal components, preventing many simplifications in formulas for tensor algebra and tensor calculus. The nonzero off-diagonal components of the metric tensor are a direct result of the non-orthogonality of the basis vectors of the coordinates, since by definition:

where  is the metric tensor and  the (covariant) basis vectors.

These coordinate systems can be useful if the geometry of a problem fits well into a skewed system. For example, solving Laplace's equation in a parallelogram will be easiest when done in appropriately skewed coordinates.

Cartesian coordinates with one skewed axis

The simplest 3D case of a skew coordinate system is a Cartesian one where one of the axes (say the x axis) has been bent by some angle , staying orthogonal to one of the remaining two axes.

Algebra and useful quantities

These represent the covariant basis; computing their dot products gives the metric tensor:

where

and

which are quantities that will be useful later on.

The contravariant basis is given by

The contravariant basis isn't a very convenient one to use, however it shows up in definitions so must be considered. We'll favor writing quantities with respect to the covariant basis.

Since the basis vectors are all constant, vector addition and subtraction will simply be familiar component-wise adding and subtraction. Now, let

where the sums indicate summation over all values of the index (in this case, i = 1, 2, 3). The contravariant and covariant components of these vectors may be related by

so that, explicitly,

The dot product in terms of contravariant components is then

and in terms of covariant components

Calculus

By definition, the gradient of a scalar function f is

where  are the coordinates x, y, z indexed. Recognizing this as a vector written in terms of the contravariant basis, it may be rewritten:

The divergence of a vector  is

and of a tensor 

The Laplacian of f is

and, since the covariant basis is normal and constant, the vector Laplacian is the same as the componentwise Laplacian of a vector written in terms of the covariant basis.

While both the dot product and gradient are somewhat messy in that they have extra terms (compared to a Cartesian system) the advection operator which combines a dot product with a gradient turns out very simple:

which may be applied to both scalar functions and vector functions, componentwise when expressed in the covariant basis.

Finally, the curl of a vector is

References

Coordinate systems